Conceição de Ipanema is a Brazilian municipality situated in state of Minas Gerais. It has an area of 234 km2. As of 2020, its population is 4,578.

History
The region was first inhabited by Indians Aimorés. The first European to reach those lands was José Pedro de Alcantara, followed by Manoel Francisco de Paula Cunha, the National Guard deserter, fugitive of the War of Santa Luzia, in 1842. The town had its beginning on the farm of Francis Ignatius Fernandes Leon, in 1850. That year, the farmer had built a chapel on his property in honor of Our Lady of Conception. In 1920, a group of people led by José da Luz Laudelino acquired the land and donated the farm to the Catholic Church. From 1917, work began on the German migration to the region with the acquisition of land by the stream of descendants of German Carlos Henrique Saar, John Kaiser and Anthony Keller, with strong influence in the culture of the city.

The village of Conception in the town of Ipanema, grew to become the district on December 27, 1948, by Law No. 336, under the name of Conceição de Ipanema. The district was promoted to the council on December 12, 1953, by Law No. 1039. On January 31, 1955, the City Council was installed and Antonio Heringer became the first mayor, with José de Oliveira as vice-mayor. José Pedro River, which rises at the side of the river flows and Caparaó Doce, cut the town in half, forming four five beaches and waterfalls, creating recreational areas for the population. The river received its name in honor of pioneer José Pedro de Alcantara. The toponymy Conceição de Ipanema is composed of two expressions: Conceição (Conception) is the patroness of the city and Ipanema connects to the name of the neighboring municipality to which it belonged. The word 'Ipanema' comes from the Tupi language Y-panéma, meaning "bad water, bad for river fishing."

References

ANACLETO, Maria Elza Rodrigues & TEIXEIRA, Rafael Anacleto. A história de Conceição de Ipanema.Ipanema: Centro Universitário de Caratinga, 2008.
CASTRO, Josiana Lopes de, & SILVA, Verônica do Nascimento e. A influência dos costumes alemães na região de Conceição de Ipanema - MG. Ipanema: Centro Universitário de Caratinga, 2008.

Municipalities in Minas Gerais